Kalutarage Eric Amila Upashantha (commonly known as Eric Upashantha; born 10 June 1972) is a former Sri Lankan cricketer, who played two Test matches and 12 One Day Internationals for Sri Lanka. He was educated at Maliyadeva College, Kurunegala. He is a right-handed batsman and a right-arm medium-fast bowler.

He bowls a considerable line and length, and plays well against seam bowlers. Upashantha played Twenty20 cricket in 2004 and List A cricket the following season. He made his Twenty20 debut on 17 August 2004, for Colts Cricket Club in the 2004 SLC Twenty20 Tournament.

International career
Upashantha had been at the edge of the Sri Lankan team for several years, having made his One Day International debut in 1995–1996. Without action in the intervening three years, he reappeared in the 1999 Asian Test Championship before his debut Test against India. He has also participated in the Pepsi Cup and 1999 Cricket World Cup.

Since 2000 he has only sporadically played for Sri Lanka, being generally second choice in his position in the team to Dilhara Fernando as the back-up to Chaminda Vaas.

References

External links

1972 births
Living people
Sri Lanka One Day International cricketers
Sri Lanka Test cricketers
Sri Lankan cricketers
Colts Cricket Club cricketers
Kurunegala Youth Cricket Club cricketers
Cheshire cricketers
Wayamba cricketers
Alumni of Maliyadeva College
Sri Lankan cricket coaches